David Jay Bordwell (born July 23, 1947) is an American film theorist and film historian.  Since receiving his PhD from the University of Iowa in 1974, he has written more than fifteen volumes on the subject of cinema including Narration in the Fiction Film (1985), Ozu and the Poetics of Cinema (1988), Making Meaning (1989), and On the History of Film Style (1997).

With his wife Kristin Thompson, Bordwell wrote the textbooks Film Art (1979) and Film History (1994). Film Art, currently being published in its 12th edition, is  still used as a seminal text in introductory film courses. With aesthetic philosopher Noël Carroll, Bordwell edited the anthology Post-Theory: Reconstructing Film Studies (1996), a polemic on the state of contemporary film theory.  His largest work to date remains The Classical Hollywood Cinema: Film Style and Mode of Production to 1960 (1985), written in collaboration with Thompson and Janet Staiger.  Several of his more influential articles on theory, narrative, and style were collected in Poetics of Cinema (2007), named in homage after the famous anthology of Russian formalist film theory Poetika Kino, edited by Boris Eikhenbaum in 1927.

Bordwell spent nearly the entirety of his career as a professor of film at the University of Wisconsin–Madison, where he is currently the Jacques Ledoux Professor of Film Studies, Emeritus in the Department of Communication Arts.  Notable film theorists who wrote their dissertations under his advisement include Edward Branigan, Murray Smith, and Carl Plantinga. He and Thompson maintain the blog "Observations on film art" for their recent ruminations on cinema.

Career
Drawing inspiration from earlier film theorists such as Noel Burch as well as from art historian Ernst Gombrich, Bordwell has contributed books and articles on classical film theory, the history of art cinema, classical and contemporary Hollywood cinema, and East Asian film style.  However, his more influential and controversial works have dealt with cognitive film theory (Narration in the Fiction Film being one of the first volumes on this subject), historical poetics of film style, and critiques of contemporary film theory and analysis (Making Meaning and Post-Theory being his two major gestures on this subject).

Neoformalism
Bordwell has also been associated with a methodological approach known as neoformalism, although this approach has been more extensively written about by his wife, Kristin Thompson. Neoformalism is an approach to film analysis based on observations first made by the literary theorists known as the Russian formalists: that there is a distinction between a film's perceptual and semiotic properties (and that film theorists have generally overstated the role of textual codes in one's comprehension of such basic elements as diegesis and closure). One scholar has commented that the cognitivist perspective is the central reason why neoformalism earns its prefix (neo) and is not "traditional" formalism. Much of Bordwell's work considers the film-goer's cognitive processes that take place when perceiving the film's nontextual, aesthetic forms. This analysis includes how films guide our attention to salient narrative information, and how films partake in 'defamiliarization', a formalist term for how art shows us familiar and formulaic objects and concepts in a manner that encourages us to experience them as if they were new entities.

Neoformalists reject many assumptions and methodologies made by other schools of film study, particularly hermeneutic (interpretive) approaches, among which he counts Lacanian psychoanalysis and certain variations of poststructuralism. In Post-Theory: Reconstructing Film Studies, Bordwell and co-editor Noël Carroll argue against these types of approaches, which they claim act as "Grand Theories" that use films to confirm predetermined theoretical frameworks, rather than attempting mid-level research meant to illuminate how films work. Bordwell and Carroll coined the term "S.L.A.B. theory" to refer to theories that use the ideas of Saussure, Lacan, Althusser, and/or Barthes.

Many philosophers have criticized neoformalism, notably Slavoj Žižek, of whom Bordwell has himself been a long-time critic. Their criticism of neoformalism is generally not based on any internal inconsistencies. Rather, critics like Žižek argue that neoformalism understates the role of culture and ideology in shaping the film text, and that analysis should reveal the problematic values of the societies in which these films are produced.

Influence
Bordwell's considerable influence within film studies has reached such a point that many of his concepts are reported to "have become part of a theoretical canon in film criticism and film academia."

Archive
The David Bordwell Collection of over one hundred 35mm film prints is held at the Academy Film Archive and is particularly noteworthy for the strength of its Hong Kong holdings.

Bibliography

 
 Ninth edition, 2009.
  Reprint of 1974 Ph.D. dissertation

 Third edition, 2010.

Select articles 
 “The Art Cinema as a Mode of Film Practice” Film Criticism 4:1 (Fall 1979); revised for Poetics of Cinema
 “Textual Analysis, Etc.” Enclitic 5:2 / 6:1 (Fall 1981 / Spring 1982); see also “Textual Analysis Revisited” Enclitic 7:1 (Spring 1983) written in response to Lawrence Crawford
 “Lowering the Stakes: Prospects for a Historical Poetics of Cinema” Iris 1:1 (1983)
 “Mizoguchi and the Evolution of Film Language” in Cinema and Language, eds. Stephen Heath and Patricia Mellencamp (AFI 1983)
 “Jump Cuts and Blind Spots” Wide Angle 6:1 (1984)
 “Widescreen Aesthetics and Mise-en-Scene Criticism” “The Velvet Light Trap 21 (Summer 1985)
 “A Salt and Battery” (with Kristin Thompson) Film Quarterly, 40:2 (Winter 1986-87; from a polemic between Bordwell/Thompson and Barry Salt regarding The Classical Hollywood Cinema and Salt's own work on classical Hollywood style and technology
 “Approppriations and ImPropprieties: Problems in the Morphology of Film Narrative” Cinema Journal 27:3 (Spring 1988
 “Adventures in the Highlands of Theory” Screen 29:1 (Winter 1988); from a polemic between Bordwell/Staiger/Thompson and Barry King regarding King's two-part review of The Classical Hollywood Cinema “A Case for Cognitivism” Iris 9 (Spring 1989); see also “A Case for Cognitivism: Further Reflections” Iris 11 (Summer 1990) written in response to Dudley Andrew
 “A Cinema of Flourishes: Japanese Decorative Classicism of the Prewar Era” in Directions in Japanese Cinema, eds. David Desser and Arthur Noletti (Indiana 1992); reprinted in Poetics of Cinema “Cognition and Comprehension: Viewing and Forgetting in Mildred Pierce” Journal of Dramatic Theory and Criticism 6:2 (Spring 1992); revised for Poetics of Cinema “Film Interpretation Revisited” Film Criticism 17:2-3 (Winter/Spring 1993); written in response to critics of Making Meaning “The Power of a Research Tradition: Prospects for a Progress in the Study of Film Style” Film History 6:1 (Spring 1994)
 “Visual Style in Japanese Cinema, 1925-1945” Film History 7:1 (Spring 1995); revised for Poetics of Cinema “Contemporary Film Studies and the Vicissitudes of Grand Theory” in Post-Theory (UW-Madison 1996)
 “Convention, Construction, and Cinematic Vision” in Post-Theory (UW-Madison 1996); reprinted in Poetics of Cinema “La Nouvelle Mission de Feuillade; or, What Was Mise-en-Scene?” The Velvet Light Trap 37 (Spring 1996); revised for Figures Traced in Light “Aesthetics in Action: Kung Fu, Gunplay, and Cinematic Expressivity” in Fifty Years of Electric Shadows, ed. Law Kar (Urban Council / Hong Kong International Film Festival 1997); reprinted in Poetics of Cinema “Richness through Imperfection: King Hu and the Glimpse” in Transcending the Times: King Hu and Eileen Chan, ed. Law Kar (Urban Council / Hong Kong International Film Festival 1998); revised for Poetics of Cinema “Transcultural Spaces: Toward a Poetics of Chinese Film” Post Script 20:2 (2001)
 “Film Futures” Substance 97 (2002); reprinted in Poetics of Cinema “Intensified Continuity: Visual Style in Contemporary American Film” Film Quarterly 55:3 (Spring 2002); revised for The Way Hollywood Tells It “Who Blinked First? How Film Style Streamlines Nonverbal Interaction” Style and Story: Essays in Honor of Torben Grodal, eds. Lennard Hojbjerg and Peter Schepelern (Museum Tusulanum Press 2003); reprinted in Poetics of Cinema “CinemaScope: The Modern Miracle You See without Glasses!” in Poetics of Cinema; an expanded revision of "Schema and Revision: Staging and Composition in Early CinemaScope" in Le CinemaScope Entre art et industrie, ed. Jean-Jacques Meusy (AFRHC 2004)
 “Rudolf Arnheim: Clarity, Simplicity, Balance” in Arnheim for Film and Media Studies, ed. Scott Higgins (Routledge 2010); an expanded revision of Simplicity, clarity, balance: A tribute to Rudolf Arnheim from davidbordwell.net (June 15, 2007)

 Select video essays 
 “How Motion Pictures Become the Movies 1908-1920: Thirteen years that changed world cinema”
 “CinemaScope: The Modern Miracle You See without Glasses!”
 “Hou Hsiao-hsien: Constraints Traditions and Trends”

Select journal issues
 Iris 9 (Spring 1989) “Cinema and Cognitive Psychology”; issue edited by Dudley Andrew, featuring essays by Bordwell (“A Case for Cognitivism”), Julian Hochberg, Virginia Brooks, Dirk Eitzen, and Michel Colin; in Iris 11 Bordwell responds to Andrew's characterization of cognitive film theory (“A Case for Cognitivism: Further Reflections”), followed by Andrew's reply
 Journal of Dramatic Theory and Criticism 6:2 (Spring 1992) “Cognitive Science and Cinema”; supplement edited by Edward S. Small, featuring essays by Bordwell (“Cognition and Comprehension: Viewing and Forgetting in Mildred Pierce”), Joseph Anderson, and Calvin Pryluck, as well as Noël Carroll's response to Warren Buckland's review of Mystifying Movies: Fads and Fallacies in Contemporary Film Theory (from Screen 30:4), a response which the editors of Screen supposedly refused to print
 Film Criticism 17:2-3 (Winter/Spring 1993), "'Film Interpretation, Inc.': Issues in Contemporary Film Studies", issue dedicated to Making Meaning, featuring essays from Edward Branigan, RIck Altman, David A. Cook, Thomas Elsaesser, Robert B. Ray, and Robin Wood; Bordwell responds in length at the end ("Film Interpretation Revisited")
 Style 32:3 (Fall 1998), “Style in Cinema”, issue edited by Bordwell, complementing On the History of Film Style'' and featuring essays by Noël Carroll, Lea Jacobs, Charles O'Brien, and Scott Higgins

References

External links

1947 births
People from Penn Yan, New York
Film theorists
Living people
University of Wisconsin–Madison faculty
American film historians
American male non-fiction writers
Historians from New York (state)